Lee M. Jackwig is a United States Bankruptcy Judge in the Southern District of Iowa.  Judge Jackwig was initially appointed on November 3, 1986 and was reappointed in 2000.  Her chambers are in Des Moines, Iowa.

Education
 Loyola University Chicago B.A. Classics (Magna Cum Laude)
 DePaul University College of Law J.D.

Background
 Assistant U.S. Attorney in the Southern District of Iowa, 1983–1986
 Deputy Industrial Commissioner, 1979–1983
 Assistant Attorney General of Iowa, 1976–1979

Former law clerks

Elizabeth "Liz" E. Goodman,
Steven P. Wandro,
Deborah Krauth,
Roberta Gilbert,
Timothy M. Feeney,
Xiaoming Wu,
Jessica Barwig,
Amy Churchill,
Charlie H. Luh,
Richard "Ric" A. Graham,
Douglas L. Barrett,
Lisa A. Tracy,
Stacey Walker,
Todd D. Ross,
Robert "Bob" C. Gainer,
Adam M. LaBoda,
R. Matthew Ingraham,
Timothy J. Van Vliet,
Matthew P. Crouch,
Jonathan W. Haas,
Jared A. Day,
Emma J. Hodson,
Gregory J. Guest,
Elizabeth L. Hartsell,
Caleb M. Gurujal,
Zacharia M. Sonallah

Notes and references

Living people
Loyola University Chicago alumni
DePaul University College of Law alumni
Year of birth missing (living people)